Catch the Wind is a 2017 French drama film directed by Gaël Morel. It was screened in the Special Presentations section at the 2017 Toronto International Film Festival.

Synopsis 
Edith, a 45-year-old textile worker, has to choose when the bosses of her factory in Villefranche-sur-Saône decide to relocate the company to Morocco. Unattached since her son left, she is the only worker who agrees to leave in order to avoid unemployment, and so she arrives in Tangiers. She will be confronted with many trials, but will discover friendship.

Cast
 Sandrine Bonnaire as Édith Clerval
 Mouna Fettou as Mina
 Ilian Bergala as Jérémy (Édith's son)
 Kamal El Amri as Ali (Mina's son)
 Soumaya Akaaboune as Madame Saïni
 Nisrine Erradi as Karima
 Farida Ouchani as Najat
 Lubna Azabal as Nadia
 Nathanaël Maïni as Thierry (Jérémy's partner)

References

External links
 

2017 films
2017 drama films
French drama films
2010s French-language films
2010s French films